The fourth season of the Sailor Moon anime series, Sailor Moon SuperS (originally released in Japan as , and later as Pretty Guardian Sailor Moon SuperS) was produced by Toei Animation and directed by Kunihiko Ikuhara. It adapts the "Dream" arc of the Sailor Moon manga series by Naoko Takeuchi and follows the adventures of Usagi Tsukino and her fellow Super Sailor Guardians. The series is divided into two story arcs: the first arc for 22 episodes depicts a mighty deity known as Pegasus, entering Chibiusa's dreams to flee from the Amazon Trio, minions of the Dead Moon Circus, who are trying to steal the legendary Golden Crystal from him. The second arc for 17 episodes depicts the arrival of the Amazoness Quartet, a group of enemies who dream of remaining young forever, as well as Queen Nehelenia, the depraved ruler of the Dead Moon Circus.

The season began broadcasting on TV Asahi on March 4, 1995, and ended on March 2, 1996. It was licensed by Cloverway Inc. and produced by Optimum Productions for an English-language broadcast in North America in 2000–02. The series was broadcast on YTV in Canada and on Cartoon Network's Toonami programming block in the United States. It was the last season to be licensed by Cloverway and the last to be dubbed by Optimum. Edited VHSs and unedited DVDs of their adaptation were released by Pioneer Entertainment. Eventually, the season was re-licensed by Viz Media in 2014 for an updated English-language release, produced by Studiopolis. The first 18 episodes of the season were released as Part 1 on Blu-ray and DVD on April 24, 2018, and the other 19 episodes were released as "Part 2" on November 13, 2018.

Three pieces of theme music were used: one opening theme and two ending themes. The opening theme, an updated version of "Moonlight Densetsu", is performed by MoonLips. The first ending theme, used for the first 13 episodes, was  performed by Miwako Fujitani. The second ending theme, used for the rest of the season, is  performed by Miyuki Kajitani, who is credited as Meu. Cloverway used the English-language version of "Moonlight Densetsu" first commissioned for DiC Entertainment's dub of the first season and R for their adaptation.



Episode list (1995–1996)

Specials

Home video releases

English

DVD

United States

Australia and New Zealand

Blu-ray

Japan

United States

Australia and New Zealand

Film 

Miracle of the Black Dream Hole, and released in the U.S. as Sailor Moon SuperS: The Movie: Black Dream Hole in the Pioneer Entertainment dub, and simply Sailor Moon SuperS: The Movie in Viz media re-dub, is an anime film directed by Hiroki Shibata and animated by Toei Animation. The film debuted in Japanese theaters on December 23, 1995, accompanied by a 16-minute short film titled .

Video games 

Several video games were released to promote this season, most of them developed or published by Bandai. In 1995, a puzzle video game titled Bishoujo Senshi Sailor Moon SuperS: Fuwa Fuwa Panic was developed by Tom Create and published by Bandai for Super Nintendo Entertainment System. The next year, also for Super NES the fighting game Bishoujo Senshi Sailor Moon SuperS: Zenin Sanka! Shuyaku Soudatsusen was developed by Monolith Soft and published by Angel, a subsidiary company of Bandai. In the same year, Bishoujo Senshi Sailor Moon SuperS: Various Emotion was released for Sega Saturn. Angel also published Bishōjo Senshi Sailor Moon SuperS: Shin Shuyaku Sōdatsusen for PlayStation. Three miscellaneous game titled Bishoujo Senshi Sailor Moon SuperS: Sailor Moon to Hiragana Lesson!, Bishoujo Senshi Sailor Moon SuperS: Youkoso! Sailor Youchien, and Bishoujo Senshi Sailor Moon SuperS: Sailor Moon to Hajimete no Eigo were released for Playdia in 1995.

References 

1995 Japanese television seasons
1996 Japanese television seasons
Circus television shows
Sailor Moon seasons
Television shows about dreams